The Ominous Parallels: The End of Freedom in America is a 1982 book by the philosopher Leonard Peikoff, in which the author compares the culture of the United States with the culture of Germany leading up to the Nazis. The book has an introduction by the philosopher Ayn Rand, who describes it as "the first book by an Objectivist philosopher other than myself". Rand credited Peikoff with identifying "the cause of Nazism—and the ominous parallels between the intellectual history of Germany and of the United States".

Publication history
The hardcover first edition was published by Stein and Day in 1982. A paperback edition was published by New American Library in 1983.

In 2013, parts of The Ominous Parallels were republished in a new work by Peikoff, The Cause of Hitler's Germany.

Reception
German expatriate Hiltgunt Zassenhaus gave the book a positive review, saying it showed the importance of working to build a free society. In a Chicago Tribune profile of Peikoff, Rogers Worthington called it "a fascinating weave of German history, philosophic determinism, and Objectivist polemic". The reviewer for The Indianapolis Star found Peikoff's description of the parallels interesting, but was disappointed that his proposed remedy was Rand's Objectivist philosophy.

References

Bibliography

 
 
 
 
 
 

1982 non-fiction books
Books about Nazism
Books by Leonard Peikoff
Contemporary philosophical literature
English-language books
Objectivist books
Stein and Day books
Nazi analogies